Porepunkah railway station was located on the Bright line serving the town of Porepunkah in Victoria. It opened on 17 October 1890 and closed on 30 November 1983.

Porepunkah station was the location where the Manfield family transported tourists who were staying with them on their trips to Mount Buffalo Chalet. It is now part of the Murray to the Mountains Rail Trail.

References

Disused railway stations in Victoria (Australia)
Railway stations in Australia opened in 1890
Railway stations closed in 1983